Beatriz Gutiérrez Müller (born 13 January 1969) is a Mexican writer, journalist, researcher, and the wife of the President of Mexico, Andrés Manuel López Obrador.

Personal life and education
Gutiérrez Müller was born in Mexico City, the daughter of Juan Gutiérrez Canet and Nora Beatriz Müller Bentjerodt, a German Chilean. She graduated with a bachelor's degree in communications from the Ibero-American University Puebla in 1998, with her thesis Regulación del uso de los medios de comunicación en leyes electorales federales (Regulation of the use of the media in federal electoral laws). She also graduated with a master's degree from the same university in 2002 with her thesis El arte de la memoria en la Historia verdadera de la conquista de la Nueva España (The art of the memory in the True History of the Conquest of New Spain). On top of this, she's also a singer, and has other written works, including La Tierra Prometida.

After graduation, she worked as a journalist for El Universal while she lived in Puebla.

She eventually joined the Mexico City government during Andrés Manuel López Obrador's period as Head of Government of Mexico City. It is during this time that they met.

On 16 October 2006, she married López Obrador and in April 2007, Jesús Ernesto López Gutiérrez was born (her firstborn, López Obrador's fourth). In spite of her being the wife of the incumbent President of Mexico, Gutiérrez Müller has rejected the title of First Lady of Mexico for being a "role with no concrete functions or responsibilities".

References 

1969 births
Living people
First ladies of Mexico
Mexican people of Chilean descent
Mexican people of German descent
People from Mexico City
Universidad Iberoamericana alumni